Marek Ďaloga (born 10 March 1989) is a Slovak professional ice hockey defenceman for HC Kometa Brno of the Czech Extraliga (ELH).

Career statistics

Regular season and playoffs

International

References

External links

1989 births
Living people
Sportspeople from Zvolen
Slovak ice hockey defencemen
Ice hockey players at the 2018 Winter Olympics
Ice hockey players at the 2022 Winter Olympics
Olympic ice hockey players of Slovakia
Medalists at the 2022 Winter Olympics
Olympic bronze medalists for Slovakia
Olympic medalists in ice hockey
HKM Zvolen players
HC 07 Detva players
HK Spišská Nová Ves players
HC Dynamo Pardubice players
HC Sparta Praha players
Ak Bars Kazan players
HC Slovan Bratislava players
HC Kunlun Red Star players
Mora IK players
Dinamo Riga players
HC Kometa Brno players
Slovak expatriate ice hockey players in the Czech Republic
Slovak expatriate ice hockey players in Sweden
Slovak expatriate sportspeople in China
Expatriate ice hockey players in China
Slovak expatriate sportspeople in Latvia
Expatriate ice hockey players in Latvia